José María Puig (26 September 1903 – 5 August 1980) was a Spanish water polo player. He competed at the 1924 Summer Olympics and the 1928 Summer Olympics.

References

External links
 

1903 births
1980 deaths
Spanish male water polo players
Olympic water polo players of Spain
Water polo players at the 1924 Summer Olympics
Water polo players at the 1928 Summer Olympics
Water polo players from Barcelona
20th-century Spanish people